ITESO, Universidad Jesuita de Guadalajara — distinct from the University of Guadalajara — also known as Instituto Tecnológico y de Estudios Superiores de Occidente, ITESO, is a Jesuit university in the Western Mexican state of Jalisco, located in the municipality of Tlaquepaque in the Guadalajara Metropolitan Area.

The university has approximately 10,000 students. Its academic options include Civil Engineering and Architecture, Food Engineering, Education, Electronic Engineering, International Business, International Relations, Chemical Engineering, Philosophy, Psychology and Social Studies, and Networks and Telecommunications Engineering. The university is affiliated to the Jesuit University System, which includes the Iberoamerican Universities in Acapulco, Mexico City, Jaltepec, León, Torreón, Puebla and Tijuana. According to the vision of Jesuits, local businesspeople, and others who planned the university, it would combine professional training with a firm sense of social responsibility.

Business projects

ITESO has a close relationship with businesses in the region through two types of extension activities:

 Business extension, which fosters ongoing strategic alliances among independent businesses.
 Academic extension, which sets up internships in the productive sector.

ITESO also has an enterprise incubation program that provides consulting for new business start-ups.

The Institutional Program for Managing Innovation and Technology (Programa Institucional para la Gestión de la Innovación y la Tecnología, PROGINNT), in conjunction with industry and different support organizations such as the Avance Program of the CONACYT, the Fund for Small and Medium-Sized Businesses (PYME) of the Ministry of the Economy, and the State Council for Science and Technology (COECYTJAL), helps regional organizations to increase their competitiveness through proper technological management. A three-phase model is used: technological diagnosis, strategic and technological planning, and administration of technological innovation projects. This program coordinates the Certificate Program in Innovation and Technology Management, which seeks to foment change in the local business culture, and also offers the services of a technology-based enterprise incubator for generating high-tech business initiatives. The model provides consulting services for the new businesses, and focuses on such sectors as food processing, pharmaceuticals, software development and electronic design – all identified as priority areas for the Jalisco economy.

ITESO also offers the services of its Center for Business Consulting to help businesses implement mechanisms for managing technology, and a Center for Competitive Intelligence, which does technology and market research including trend studies, forecasts, strategic, market and patent studies, corporate and sectorial profiles, and other services.

Educational partnerships

Regis University and ITESO have a joint MBA program to prepare Latin American and U.S. Latino executives/entrepreneurs for the opportunities in emerging economies around the world. This was the first graduate business program in Latin America designed to develop successful entrepreneurial and business skills for emerging markets such as China, Brazil, Russia, and India. It also covers innovative strategies to enter and expand operations in developed markets.

Social service projects
Some of the over 200 social projects in which the university participates are: "Southern Region", sustainable development in southern Jalisco
"Sierra Wixárika", protection of the Huichol Indians’ territory and environment, improvement of productive systems, education, and health and "Alternative Rural Financing System" which offers poor families from rural areas of Jalisco organizational, administrative, and financial tools for raising their standard of living

Environmental projects
ITESO proposes feasible alternatives for problems affecting our surroundings, from an environmental and sustainable-development perspective. Environmental programs within the university such as "ITESO, Sustainable Community," and its facilities in La Primavera Forest, complement rural sustainable development projects in impoverished regions of Jalisco, Chiapas, and Veracruz. Since the year 2000, ITESO has taken part in a number of reforestation projects, as well as campaigns for preventing and combating forest fires.

See also
 List of Jesuit sites
 Universidad Iberoamericana
 Universidad Iberoamericana Puebla

References

External links
ITESO 

ITESO, Universidad Jesuita de Guadalajara
Jesuit universities and colleges in Mexico
Educational institutions established in 1958
1957 establishments in Mexico